William Paget, 6th Baron Paget (10 February 1637 – 26 February 1713) was an English peer and ambassador. He was the eldest son of William Paget, 5th Baron Paget and Lady Isabella Rich, daughter of Henry Rich, 1st Earl of Holland.

Paget was English ambassador to Vienna between 1689 and 1692. Appointed as ambassador to the Ottoman Empire at Constantinople in June 1692. The Royal Instructions arrived on 5 September and he left England a week later. He travelled via Vienna, which he left on 12 December, arriving at Adrianople on 30 January 1693. He finally reached Constantinople in July. Paget asked to be recalled in 1697, during which time he was central to the negotiation of the Treaty of Carlowitz between the Ottomans and the Habsburgs. His cousin, the poet Aaron Hill, visited him in Constantinople. He was finally brought home in May 1702.

Paget owned considerable estates in Staffordshire, particularly around Burton on Trent. In 1699, he obtained an Act of Parliament to extend navigation on the River Trent from Nottingham up to Burton, but nothing was immediately done. In 1711, Lord Paget leased his rights to George Hayne, who carried out improvements, quickly opening the river to Burton and stimulating the export of Burton Ale.

Lord Paget married twice, firstly to Frances Pierrepont, daughter of Francis Pierrepont and Elizabeth Bray,  by whom he had a son and heir Henry Paget, 1st Earl of Uxbridge. He married secondly his cousin Isabella Irby, daughter of Sir Anthony Irby and Paget's aunt Catherine Paget.

References

Further reading
 
 
 Letters and papers of William Paget, 6th Baron Paget are held by SOAS Archives.

1637 births
1713 deaths
Ambassadors of England to the Ottoman Empire
Lord-Lieutenants of Staffordshire
18th-century English people
William
17th-century English diplomats
18th-century diplomats
Barons Paget